The Thulin H was a Swedish reconnaissance/bomber plane built in the late 1910s.

Design and development
The Thulin H was a five-seat biplane powered by three engines, one tractor and two arranged in separate nacelles in pusher form. It was designed to take off and land on water. The Type H flew in August 1917 and passed tests, but the end of World War I obviated the need for a large reconnaissance bomber floatplane. Enoch Thulin offered the Thulin H to the civilian market for use as a transport plane, but no orders were placed.

Specifications

See also

References

Biplanes
Three-engined aircraft
1910s Swedish aircraft
Aircraft first flown in 1917